The City That Never Sleeps may refer to:

 The City That Never Sleeps (nickname), New York or other cities
 The City That Never Sleeps (film), silent 1924 drama
 City That Never Sleeps, a 1953 film noir
 The City That Never Sleeps: Shinjuku Shark or Nemuranai Machi: Shinjuku Same, 1993 Japanese film
 The City That Never Sleeps, 2013 episode of the American television series Blue Bloods
 The City That Never Sleeps, 1993 book of artwork by Archer Prewitt
 Spider-Man: The City That Never Sleeps, downloadable content for the 2018 video game Spider-Man

See also 
The City That Sleeps, rock album